Leslie Keating (1 October 1891 – 13 March 1962) was an Australian cricketer. He played 16 first-class cricket matches for Victoria between 1919 and 1925.

See also
 List of Victoria first-class cricketers

References

External links
 

1891 births
1962 deaths
Australian cricketers
Victoria cricketers
Cricketers from Melbourne